Mani is a town in Hadjer-Lamis region, western Chad, south of the Lake Chad, on the border with Cameroon.

References 

Hadjer-Lamis Region
Populated places in Chad
Cameroon–Chad border crossings